LGBT youth vulnerability is the increased social vulnerability that lesbian, gay, bisexual, and transgender (LGBT) youth face compared to their heterosexual and cisgender peers. Due to this increased vulnerability, there are notable differences in the mental and physical health risks tied to the social interactions of LGBT youth compared to the social interactions of heterosexual youth. Youth of the LGBT community experience greater encounters with not only health risks, but also violence and bullying, due to their sexual orientation, self-identification, and lack of support from institutions in society.

Health studies 
LGBT youth face a variety of stressors that affect their mental health. Due to society’s tendency to discriminate against non-heterosexual sexual orientations and identities, members of the LGBT community are 3 times more likely to face mental health disorders. For instance, the constant fear of not being accepted after coming out to one’s community can lead to an anxiety disorder, depression, PTSD, suicidal thoughts, or substance abuse. According to the National Alliance on Mental Illness (NAMI) LGBT teens, in particular, “are 6 times more likely to experience symptoms of depression” than their heterosexual peers as they are just beginning to navigate how to come out to friends, family, and other associates, while still developing into an adult.

Because of the crucial development stages youth experience before adolescence, it is more likely for mental disorder to be expressed if a stressor is presented. It was  reported in 2012  that within the year, 10% of youth in America demonstrated a mood disorder, 25% presentes an anxiety disorder, and 8.3% presented a substance use disorder. Also, the third leading cause of death for the 10-14 age group is suicide and the second leading cause for those 15-24. Out of these statistics, youth of the LGBT community are three times more likely to experience and report suicidality.

Some studies that have been conducted are not completely inclusive of the entire LGBT community because of its rapid growth and expansion. The Centers for Disease Control and Prevention conducted a 2015 Youth Risk and Behavior Survey (YRBS), that surveyed approximately 1,285,000 LGB youth out of 16,067,000 students total in grades 9-12 nationwide and was able to provide evidence of greater physical and mental vulnerabilities among the youth of the LGBT community.

The survey found that 10% of LGB students were threatened with a weapon on school property, 34% were bullied at school, 28% of LGB students were bullied electronically and 18% experienced physical dating violence. Another 18% of LGB students had been forced to have sexual intercourse at some point. These results were successful in pointing out these vulnerabilities of LGB students, however, about 514,000 students included in the survey were not sure of their “sexual identity.” According to the CDC, there are a couple of things the school can do that are evidence and research based to help the school become a healthy place for all children, and those ways are: encourage respect for all children, no matter what their ethnicity is or sexual orientation and ban bullying, harassment, or violence. Then identify "safe places" on campus for the students like a counselor's office or a designated classroom where students of the LGBTQ community can find support and feel safe, and ensure the health curriculum and sex education is up to date regarding the LGBTQ community and have HIV, STD, and pregnancy prevention information that is relevant to them.

Another survey conducted by the Human Rights Campaign titled, “Growing Up LGBT in America,” acknowledges the vulnerabilities faced by about 10,000 LGBT youth from the age of 13 to 17. This survey found that 4 out of 10 youth felt that their neighborhoods weren’t accepting of the LGBT community. On top of this 73% of youth surveyed admitted to being more honest about their identity online and 26% identified their largest “problems” as being related to being out and accepted at home and/or school. The contrast this survey makes to 22% of non LGBT youth who identified their largest “problems” as relating to academics displays the different mindsets that are present in the two groups, thus representing the different mental effects LGBT youth experience.

Differences in vulnerability among subgroups 
Diversity exists within the LGBT community, and the community may be more accepting of some members than others. LGBT youth that are also racial and ethnic minorities may be met with prejudice by white members of the LGBT community. Additionally, LGBT youth may be rejected by their racial and ethnic communities. Some communities of color may not be accepting of LGBT youth because homosexuality is seen as a reflection of ideals of white, urban society. LGBT youth of color may struggle to integrate their identity because their religious beliefs. For example, the Latinx community traditionally practices Catholicism – a religion that considers homosexuality a sin.

Bisexual individuals can also face rejection from other members of the LGBT community. Homophobia has resulted in our society dichotomizing sexual orientation (homosexual or heterosexual) rather than viewing sexual orientation as a variable construct. Transgender individuals have a gender identity that does not match their biological sex and can belong to any sexual orientation. Transgender individuals are victimized at higher rates than lesbian, gay, and bisexual youth, and they also have worse mental health outcomes.

Preventing poor mental health outcomes for LGBT youth

School Districts 
Schools should enact anti-discrimination regulations for LGBT students. School administrators should create safe communities for students and staff to work openly. Districts and staff should conduct trainings to ensure cultural competency in teaching LGBT youth and protecting against LGBT related bullying incidents.

School counselors 
School counselors should be educated on issues LGBT students face and be aware of their own biases. School counselors should not assume that students are heterosexual, and it is important for them to use gender neutral language when asking students about their relationships. School counselors can display LGBTQ books as well as posters to signal to students that their office is a safe space. School counselors can also provide psychoeducation to school faculty and administrators on risk of victimization among LGBTQ students and advocate for the safety of all students.

Leaders in schools and communities 
Schools are encouraged to address bullying proactively and educate students on anti-bullying policies. If policies are not already in place, schools should enact policies that prohibit harassment. Schools should have GSA to support LGBT students as well as promote a more accepting school climate. If school and community leaders should make programs for LGBT youth available in the community, and can reach out to groups, such as the Trevor Project for education on such topics.

Parents 
Parents are also encouraged to take a proactive approach and let their children know they are loved regardless of the sexual orientation and gender identity. When children do come out as LGBT, parents should react with support.

Media 
Online platforms have become a way to communicate common, and uncommon, standpoints globally. Hashtags and campaigns are present methods of spreading the word about public issues and topics. As the LGBT community uses online platforms to interact with society and run campaigns that advocate for the community, it embraces vulnerability in order to overcome it.

National Coming Out Day takes place on October 11 and is a day for LGBT individuals to willingly disclose their sexual orientation or identity. This can take place in many ways that include, but are not limited, to social media announcements and coming out to close family members. Because of current technology platforms that allow for social networking, much of National Coming Out Day can be observed on sites such as Facebook, Twitter, Instagram, and Youtube. The Human Rights Campaign has conducted a survey tracking the impact of National Coming Out Day nationwide. 91% of LGBT youth who participated in the survey came out to close friends and reported more overall happiness as they continued to live in their communities and interact with friends, family, and classmates.

Another holiday that was created to celebrate The LGBTQ community and is celebrated in the month of October is called, LGBT History Month and it was originally created in October 1994 by Rodney Wilson and he was the first openly gay teacher in Missouri. In 2009, our current president at the time, Barack Obama officially made it a National History Month and that whole month is dedicated to learning about their rights, expressing openness, and celebrating the LGBTQ community together. In 2020, there are many places besides the United States that learn and celebrate it all month long like, The United Kingdom, Hungary, United States, Brazil, Canada, Greenland, the city of Berlin, and Australia; and in 2012 two schools in the United States celebrated LGBT History Month.

A similar initiative taken online in the LGBT community is International Transgender Day of Visibility. This day takes place on March 31 and recognizes transgender individuals in an effort to empower those who identify as transgender in the LGBT community. Rachel Crandell founded this day in 2009 and it has since fought against “cissexism” and “transphobia.” [3] Initiatives like National Coming Out Day and the International Transgender Day of Visibility are public reminders of the potential social media holds in educating the masses and raising awareness of the LGBT community.

Support organizations 

 Audre Lorde Project 
 The Trevor Project 
 It Gets Better Project 
Keith Haring Foundation

See also 
 LGBTQ psychology
 Suicide among LGBT youth

References 

LGBT youth
Sexual orientation and psychology